The 1991–92 AHL season was the 56th season of the American Hockey League. The league realigns from divisions into three divisions, creating the new Atlantic division. Fifteen teams played 80 games each in the schedule. The Fredericton Canadiens finished first overall in the regular season. The Adirondack Red Wings won their fourth Calder Cup championship.

Team changes
 The Newmarket Saints move to St. John's, Newfoundland, becoming the St. John's Maple Leafs, playing in the Atlantic Division.
 The Fredericton Canadiens, Cape Breton Oilers, Moncton Hawks and Halifax Citadels all shift from the North Division to the Atlantic Division.
 The Adirondack Red Wings and Capital District Islanders shift from the South Division to the North.

Final standings
Note: GP = Games played; W = Wins; L = Losses; T = Ties; GF = Goals for; GA = Goals against; Pts = Points;

Scoring leaders

Note: GP = Games played; G = Goals; A = Assists; Pts = Points; PIM = Penalty minutes

 complete list

Calder Cup playoffs

For the Semifinal round, the team that earned the most points during the regular season out of the three remaining teams receives a bye directly to the Calder Cup Final.

Trophy and award winners

Team awards

Individual awards

Other awards

See also
List of AHL seasons

References
AHL official site
AHL Hall of Fame
HockeyDB

 
American Hockey League seasons
2
2